Eugene Wang (born Wang Zhen 王臻 on November 13, 1985 in Shijiazhuang) is a Canadian table tennis player. He was given permission to compete for Canada in June 2012, allowing him to represent Canada at the 2012 Summer Olympics in the men's team event.  He trains in Saarbruken, Germany.

In June 2016, he was officially named to Canada's 2016 Olympic team.

Wang competed in the 2019 Butterfly Canadian National Championships in both Men's Singles & Men's Doubles, pairing with 2018 Champion Jeremy Hazin. Wang & Hazin won the doubles event, defeating the Québec duo of Antoine Bernadet & Marko Medjugorac in the Finals. Wang would go on to face both men again in the singles bracket, felling Medjugorac in the semi finals and Bernadet in the Finals. Wang's victory over Bernadet was a sweep (11-3 11-4 11-8 11-5).

He represented Canada at the 2020 Summer Olympics.

References

https://www.tournamentsoftware.com/sport/player.aspx?id=EBCD984A-7589-470A-9272-248FDB150BE3&player=250

1985 births
Living people
Canadian male table tennis players
Table tennis players from Shijiazhuang
Table tennis players at the 2012 Summer Olympics
Naturalized citizens of Canada
Canadian sportspeople of Chinese descent
Olympic table tennis players of Canada
Table tennis players at the 2014 Commonwealth Games
Table tennis players at the 2015 Pan American Games
Pan American Games bronze medalists for Canada
Table tennis players at the 2016 Summer Olympics
Pan American Games medalists in table tennis
Universiade medalists in table tennis
Naturalised table tennis players
Table tennis players at the 2018 Commonwealth Games
Universiade gold medalists for China
Chinese male table tennis players
Table tennis players at the 2019 Pan American Games
Medalists at the 2015 Pan American Games
Medalists at the 2019 Pan American Games
Commonwealth Games competitors for Canada
Table tennis players at the 2020 Summer Olympics
20th-century Canadian people
21st-century Canadian people